Victory in Jesus can refer to:

 A shape note gospel song written by Eugene Monroe Bartlett and published in 1939
 A ministry founded by NASCAR driver Morgan Shepherd
 A daily radio and television broadcast by Billy Joe Daugherty